Osaka Prefectural Board of Education is a branch of the government of Osaka Prefecture, Japan.

The board supervises individual municipal school systems and directly operates public high schools in Osaka prefecture.

Schools operated by the prefecture

High schools operated by the prefecture

Daito
 Nozaki High School 
 Ryokufukan High School  (Merger of Daito High School and South Neyagawa High School)

Fujiidera
 Fujiidera High School

Habikino
 Habikino High School 
 Nishiura High School

Higashiosaka
 Fuse High School 
 Fuse North High School 
 Hanazono High School 
 Ikejima High School 
 Kawachino High School

Hirakata
 Hirakata High School 
 Hirakata Nagisa High School 
 Hirakata Tsuda High School 
 Korigaoka High School 
 Makino High School 
 Nagao High School

Ibaraki
 Fukui High School 
 Ibaraki High School 
 Ibaraki East High School 
 Ibaraki West High School 
 Kasugaoka High School

Ikeda
 Ikeda High School 
 Ikeda North High School 
 Shibutani High School

Kadoma
 Kadoma West High School

Kashiwara
 Kashiwara East High School

Katano
 Katano High School

Kawachinagano
 Nagano High School 
 Nagano North High School

Matsubara
 Ikuno High School 
 Ohtsuka High School

Minoh
 Minoh High School 

Mishima District
 Shimamoto High School  (Shimamoto)

Moriguchi
 Moriguchi East High School

Neyagawa

 East Neyagawa High School 
 Neyagawa High School 
 West Neyagawa High School

Osaka

Abeno-ku
 Abeno High School 
 Tennoji High School

Asahi-ku
 Asahi High School

Chūō-ku
 Otemae High School

Higashiyodogawa-ku
 Higashiyodogawa High School

Hirano-ku
 East Sumiyoshi High School 
 Hirano High School

Ikuno-ku
 Katsuyama High School

Minato-ku
 Ichioka High School 
 Minato High School

Nishinari-ku
 Nishinari High School

Nishiyodogawa-ku
 Nishiyodogawa High School

Sumiyoshi-ku
 Hannan High School 
 Yamatogawa High School

Taisho-ku
 Izuo High School 
 Taisho High School

Tennoji-ku
 Kozu High School 
 Shimizudani High School 
 Yuhigaoka High School  (English: ,)

Tsurumi-ku
 Matta High School

Yodogawa-ku
 Kitano High School 
 North Yodo High School

Osakasayama
 Sayama High School

Sakai
 Kanaoka High School 
 Mihara High School 
 Mikuni Gaoka High School 
 Ohtori High School 
 Senyo High School 
 Tomioka High School 

Settsu
 Settsu High School 
 Torikai High School

Shinjonawate
 Shijonawate High School 
 Shijonawate North High School

Suita
 Kitasenri High School 
 Suita High School 
 Suita East High School 
 Yamada High School

Takatsuki
 Abuno High School 
 Akutagawa High School 
 Mishima High School 
 Shimamoto High School
 Ohkanmuri High School 
 Takatsuki North High School

Tondabayashi
 Kanan High School 
 Kongo High School 
 Tondabayashi High School

Toyonaka
 East Toyonaka High School 
 Sakurazuka High School 
 Shoji High School 
 Teshima High School 
 Toneyama High School  
 Toyonaka High School

Toyono District
 Shiroyama High School  (Toyono)

Yao
 Seiyu High School 
 Yamamoto High School 
 Yao High School 
 Yao Suisho High School

Former schools
 Daito High School (Daito)  (merged into Ryokufukan High School)
 Hirakata West High School (Hirakata)  (Closed March 31, 2006)
 Isoshima High School (Hirakata) 
 Kano High School  (Higashiosaka) (Closed March 31, 2006)
 South Neyagawa High School (Neyagawa)  (merged into Ryokufukan High School)
 Suminoe High School  (Osaka)
 Tatetsu High School  (Higashiosaka)

See also
  List of public high schools in Osaka Prefecture (Japanese）

References

External links
 Osaka Prefectural Board of Education (Japanese)

Prefectural school systems in Japan
Education in Osaka Prefecture